Virginia Middle School is a former high school, is a historical landmark, and is now a middle school located in Bristol, Virginia. It is a part of Bristol Virginia Public Schools.

History
Located at 501 Piedmont Avenue, the original section of the school was completed in 1914 and served as Virginia High School until 1953. In 1953, a new high school was built and this site became Virginia Junior High School serving seventh and eighth grade students. After a concept study by the School Board, the name was changed to Virginia Middle School in 1990. The school underwent an extensive renovation in 1995 and was completed for total occupancy in 1996, allowing it to serve the sixth through eighth grades. The school presently serves grades six through eight.  The building was added to the Virginia Landmarks Register in 1996 and received National Register of Historic Places status in 1997.

References

External links
 School division website

School buildings on the National Register of Historic Places in Virginia
Public middle schools in Virginia
Schools in Bristol, Virginia
National Register of Historic Places in Bristol, Virginia